Kevin Curren was the defending champion, but did not participate this year.

Joakim Nyström won the tournament, beating Milan Šrejber in the final, 6–1, 6–4.

Seeds

  Joakim Nyström (champion)
  Aaron Krickstein (first round)
  Wojtek Fibak (first round)
  Jonathan Canter (semifinals)
  Christo Steyn (first round)
  Francisco Maciel (first round)
  Shahar Perkiss (second round)
  Mark Dickson (first round)

Draw

Finals

Top half

Bottom half

References

 Main Draw

1986 Singles
1986 Grand Prix (tennis)